Werner Neubauer (born  29 October 1956) is an Austrian politician who has been a Member of the National Council for the Freedom Party of Austria (FPÖ) since 2006.

Honours
 Order of the Rising Sun, Gold Rays with Ribbon, 2020

References

1956 births
Living people
Members of the National Council (Austria)
Freedom Party of Austria politicians